Manera is a surname. Notable people with the surname include:

Anthony S. Manera, President of the Canadian Broadcasting Corporation
Paul Manera (born 1967), Australian player of American football
Teresa Manera, Argentine paleontologist

See also
Eduardo Luján Manera (1944–2000), Argentine footballer and manager